Andrea Nott (born April 15, 1982) is an American competitor in synchronised swimming. She swam with Christina Jones in the duet event at the 2008 Summer Olympics in Beijing, placing fifth.

References

External links 
 Biography at United States Synchronized Swimming

Living people
1982 births
American synchronized swimmers
Swimmers from San Jose, California
Olympic synchronized swimmers of the United States
Synchronized swimmers at the 2007 Pan American Games
Synchronized swimmers at the 2008 Summer Olympics
Pan American Games competitors for the United States
The Harker School alumni